Death Walks is a zero-budget horror film directed by Spencer Hawken. The film stars Jessie Williams, Lucinda Rhodes-Flaherty, and Francesca Ciardi, and centres on a group of people trying to survive inside a shopping center that is under attack by the dead. Death Walks is Ciardi's first horror film since her role as Faye Daniels in the 1980 film Cannibal Holocaust and her first film role in over 20 years, her previous film being 1991's Safari.

Synopsis
In an East London shopping centre, a group of people are warned by a strange Italian woman (Francesca Ciardi) that they are all going to die. Her warnings prove to be all too real, as the shopping center is then attacked by zombies fueled by an evil supernatural power. The 25 people remaining in the shopping centre must band together to survive the night. This is made more difficult by the rising tensions as well as the fact that the surrounding town is oblivious of their torment due to a street party.

Cast
Francesca Ciardi as Lucrezia
Lucinda Rhodes-Flaherty as Louise
Jon Guerriero as John
Jessie Williams as Poppy
Joanna Finata as Alice
Daniel Smales as Steve
Scott Mullins as Rob
Karis Pentecost as Beth

Production
Hawken began work on Death Walks in the summer of 2013. Filming took place in Romford, London, during 2013, and included multiple extras, many of whom were volunteers from the surrounding community.

Hawken used the town's Mercury Mall shopping center – which donated the use of its space – and was able to complete the film through crowdsourcing techniques. Other supporters either loaned Hawken their supplies for free or donated them.

Hawken initially planned for the filming to take place over a 24-hour period, but it instead took place over four months. During this time the cast swelled from 300 extras to nearly 1,000.

Editing for Death Walks was expected to complete in February 2013 so the film could be submitted to various film festivals, and a successful Kickstarter campaign was launched in early January 2013 to help with the submission costs. A trailer was released in August 2013.

On 16 January 2014, Famous Monsters Of Filmland acknowledged the film's completion as the first zero-budget horror film and posted that Hawken was already working on a sequel.

The premiere of Death Walks was held in the centre it was shot in on 15 July 2016, exactly three years from the time shooting begun.

Reception
After the premiere, the Romford Recorder newspaper was quick to herald the movie a success, calling it funny, unsettling and surprising.

On 29 October 2016, the film played at the British Horror Film Festival. It was nominated for Best Film, the British Horror Award, Best Supporting Actor, Best Supporting Actress and Best Music. The film won two awards, Best Supporting Actor (Jon Guerriero) and Best Music (Tom Wolfe). It narrowly missed out on the British Horror Award, after judges decided The Barber's Cuts use of visual effects on 35mm film was a bigger achievement.

In September 2016, the Monkey Bread Festival gave the film a special mention for its zero-budget achievement.

The film was screened as part of the Terror Film Festival on 20 October 2016.

Death Walks was released on Amazon Prime on 18 January 2017.

Awards

|-
| 2016
| Jon Guerriero / Best Supporting Actor
| British Horror Film Festival
| 
|-
| 2016
| Lucinda Rhodes / Best Supporting Actress
| British Horror Film Festival
| 
|-
| 2016
| Spencer Hawken / Best Feature Film
| British Horror Film Festival
| 
|-
| 2016
| Spencer Hawken / British Horror Award
| British Horror Film Festival
| 
|-
| 2016
| Tom Wolfe / Best Music
| British Horror Film Festival
| 
|-
| 2016
| Spencer Hawken / Best Director
| Puerto Rico Horror Film Festival
| 
|-
| 2016
| Marcus Uthup / Best Cinematography
| Terror Film Festival
| 
|-
| 2016
| Tom Wolfe / Best Original Music Score
| Terror Film Festival
| 
|-
| 2016
| Spencer Hawken / Best Feature Film Screenplay
| Terror Film Festival
| 
|-
| 2016
| Spencer Hawken / Best Motion Picture Editing
| Terror Film Festival
| 
|-
| 2016
| Shaun Lee / Best Sound Design
| Terror Film Festival
| 
|-
| 2016
| Spencer Hawken / Excellence in the craft of Screenwriting 
| Terror Film Festival
| 
|}

References

External links
 
 
 

2016 films
Films shot in London
British horror films
British zombie films
2010s English-language films
2010s British films